The 2000 Tokyo Sevens was an international rugby sevens tournament that was part of the World Sevens Series in the inaugural 1999–2000 season. It was the Japan Sevens leg of the series, held at Chichibunomiya Rugby Stadium in Tokyo on 1–2 April 2000.

The tournament was the ninth event of the series, and was won by Fiji who defeated New Zealand 27–22 in the Cup final.

Format
The teams were drawn into four pools of four teams each. Each team played the other teams in their pool once, with 3 points awarded for a win, 2 points for a draw, and 1 point for a loss (no points awarded for a forfeit). The pool stage was played on the first day of the tournament. The top two teams from each pool advanced to the Cup/Plate brackets. The bottom two teams from each pool went on to the Bowl bracket. No Shield trophy was on offer in the 1999-2000 season.

Teams
The 16 participating teams for the tournament:

Pool stage
The pool stage was played on the first day of the tournament. The 16 teams were separated into four pools of four teams and teams in the same pool played each other once. The top two teams in each pool advanced to the Cup quarterfinals to compete for the 2000 Tokyo Sevens title.

Pool A

Source: World Rugby

Source: World Rugby

Pool B

Source: World Rugby

Source: World Rugby

Pool C

Source: World Rugby

Source: World Rugby

Pool D

Source: World Rugby

Source: World Rugby

Knockout stage

Bowl

Source: World Rugby

Plate

Source: World Rugby

Cup

Source: World Rugby

Tournament placings

Source: Rugby7.com

Series standings
At the completion of Round 9:

Source: Rugby7.com

 South Africa reached the semifinal stage of the Brisbane Sevens but was stripped of all points for the tournament due to fielding ineligible players.

References

1999–2000 IRB Sevens World Series
Seven
Japan Sevens